Gorytes is a genus of sand wasps in the family Crabronidae. There are at least 70 described species in Gorytes.

Species
These 75 species belong to the genus Gorytes:

 Gorytes abdominalis Cresson, 1865 i c g
 Gorytes aequalis Handlirsch, 1888 i c g
 Gorytes africanus Mercet, 1905 i c g
 Gorytes aino Tsuneki, 1963 i c g
 Gorytes albidulus (Lepeletier, 1832) i c g
 Gorytes albilabris (Lepeletier, 1832) g
 Gorytes albosignatus W. Fox, 1892 i c g
 Gorytes ambiguus Handlirsch, 1888 i c g
 Gorytes angustus (Provancher, 1895) i c g
 Gorytes atricornis Packard, 1867 i c g b
 Gorytes atrifrons W. Fox, 1892 i c g
 Gorytes butleri (R. Bohart, 1969) i c g
 Gorytes californicus (R. Bohart, 1969) i c g
 Gorytes canaliculatus Packard, 1867 i c g
 Gorytes catalinae (R. Bohart, 1969) i c g
 Gorytes claripennis (R. Bohart, 1969) i c g
 Gorytes cochisensis R. Bohart, 1971 i c g
 Gorytes deceptor Krombein, 1958 i c g
 Gorytes divisus F. Smith, 1856 i c g
 Gorytes dorothyae Krombein, 1950 i c g b
 Gorytes effugiens Brauns, 1911 i c g
 Gorytes erugatus (R. Bohart, 1969) i c g
 Gorytes fallax Handlirsch, 1888 i c g
 Gorytes fasciatus W. Fox, 1896 i c g
 Gorytes flagellatus R. Bohart, 1971 i c g
 Gorytes flavidulus (R. Bohart, 1969) i c g
 Gorytes foveolatus Handlirsch, 1888 i c g
 Gorytes guerrero (R. Bohart, 2000) i c g
 Gorytes hadrus (R. Bohart, 1969) i c g
 Gorytes harbinensis Tsuneki, 1967 c g
 Gorytes hebraeus de Beaumont, 1953 i c g
 Gorytes imperialis (R. Bohart, 1969) i c g
 Gorytes intrudens Nurse, 1903 i c g
 Gorytes ishigakiensis Tsuneki, 1982 i c g
 Gorytes jonesi (R. Turner, 1920) i c g
 Gorytes kohlii Handlirsch, 1888 i c g
 Gorytes kulingensis Yasumatsu, 1943 i c g
 Gorytes laticinctus (Lepeletier, 1832) i c g
 Gorytes limbellus R. Bohart, 1971 i c g
 Gorytes maculicornis (F. Morawitz, 1889) i c g
 Gorytes mcateei Krombein and R. Bohart, 1962 i c g
 Gorytes melpomene (Arnold, 1936) i c g
 Gorytes montanus Cameron, 1890 i c g
 Gorytes natalensis F. Smith, 1856 i c g
 Gorytes neglectus Handlirsch, 1895 i c g
 Gorytes nevadensis W. Fox, 1892 i c g
 Gorytes nigricomus (R. Bohart, 1969) i c g
 Gorytes nigrifacies (Mocsáry, 1879) i c g
 Gorytes nyasicus (R. Turner, 1915) i c g
 Gorytes ocellatus (R. Bohart, 1969) i c g
 Gorytes pieli Yasumatsu, 1943 i c g
 Gorytes planifrons (Wesmael, 1852) i c g
 Gorytes pleuripunctatus (A. Costa, 1859) i c g
 Gorytes procrustes Handlirsch, 1888 i c g
 Gorytes prosopis R. Bohart, 1971 i c g
 Gorytes provancheri Handlirsch, 1895 i c g
 Gorytes quadrifasciatus (Fabricius, 1804) i c g
 Gorytes quinquecinctus (Fabricius, 1793) i c g
 Gorytes quinquefasciatus (Panzer, 1798) i c g
 Gorytes ranosahae Arnold, 1945 i c g
 Gorytes rubiginosus Handlirsch, 1888 i c g
 Gorytes rufomaculatus W. Fox, 1896 i c g
 Gorytes samiatus (R. Bohart, 1969) i c g
 Gorytes schlettereri Handlirsch, 1893 i c g
 Gorytes schmidti Schmid-Egger, 2002 i c g
 Gorytes schmiedeknechti Handlirsch, 1888 i c g
 Gorytes simillimus F. Smith, 1856 i c g b
 Gorytes smithii Cresson, 1880 i c g
 Gorytes sulcifrons (A. Costa, 1867) i c g
 Gorytes tanythrix (R. Bohart, 1969) i c g
 Gorytes tobiasi Nemkov, 1990 i c g
 Gorytes tricinctus (Pérez, 1905) i c g
 Gorytes umatillae R. Bohart, 1971 i c g
 Gorytes venustus Cresson, 1865 i c g
 Gorytes willcoxi (Ohl, 2009) i c g b

Data sources: i = ITIS, c = Catalogue of Life, g = GBIF, b = Bugguide.net

References

Crabronidae
Apoidea genera